Anusim (singular male, anús,  ; singular female, anusáh, meaning "coerced") is a legal category of Jews in halakha (Jewish law) who were forced to abandon Judaism against their will, typically while forcibly converted to another religion. The term "anusim" is most properly translated as the "coerced [ones]" or the "forced [ones]".

Etymology
The term anusim derives from the Talmudic phrase averah b’ones, meaning "a forced transgression." The Hebrew ones (pronounced "oh'nes") derives from the triconsonantal root  (Aleph-Nun-Samekh), and originally referred to any case where a person has been forced into any act against his or her will. In Modern Hebrew, the word ones is mainly used to mean rape, thus "anusim" (or female "anusot") nowadays means rape victims, the older meaning used only in the historical context.

The term anús is used in contradistinction to meshumad, (literally "self-destroyed") which means a person who has voluntarily abandoned the practice of Jewish law in whole or in part. The forced converts were also known as cristianos nuevos (Spanish) or  cristãos-novos (Portuguese); converso or marrano, which had and still has today a pejorative connotation in Spanish.

Related terms

Besides the term anusim, halakha has various classifications for those Jews who have abandoned, or are no longer committed to, the rabbinic Jewish tradition, whether or not they have converted to another religion.

The two most common descriptions are:

 "Min, or an apostate of Judaism, for a Jew who basically denies the existence of God; and
 "Meshumad, literally "self-destroyed" or a heretic to Judaism, for a Jew who deliberately rebels against the observance of Jewish law.

The main difference between a min, a meshumad, and the anusim is that the act of abandonment of Judaism is voluntary for a min and a meshumad, while for the anusim it is not.

In more recent times, the term Anusim has also been used to describe "Reverse Marranos", that is, Haredi Jews who are religious on the outside, but are not necessarily practicing in private.

History of use
The term anusim became more frequently used after the forced conversion to Christianity of Ashkenazi Jews in Germany at the end of the 11th century. In his religious legal opinions, Rashi, a French rabbi who lived during this period, commented about the issue of anusim.

Several centuries later, following the mass forced conversion of Sephardi Jews (those Jews with extended histories in Spain and Portugal, known jointly as Iberia, or "Sepharad" in Hebrew) of the 15th and 16th centuries, the term "anusim" became widely used by Spanish rabbis and their successors for the following 600 years, henceforth becoming associated with Sephardic history.

The term may be properly applied to any Jew of any ethnic division. Since that time, it has also been applied to other forced or coerced converted Jews, such as the Mashadi Jews of Persia (modern Iran), who converted to Islam in the public eye, but secretly practised Judaism at home. They lived dual-religious lives, being fully practising Muslims in public life, and fully practising Jews at home.

In non-rabbinic literature, the more widely known Sephardic anusim are also referred to as:
"Conversos", meaning "converts [to Christianity]" in Spanish, Portuguese, Catalan and Ladino (Judaeo-Spanish).
"New Christians", or cristianos nuevos in Spanish, and cristãos novos in Portuguese (Catalan: cristians nous), which also encompasses converts from Islam.
"Crypto-Jews", and
"Marranos", a term which refers to those conversos which practiced Judaism in secret and, as a result, were targeted by the Spanish inquisition.

In rabbinic literature
The subject of anusim has a special place in rabbinic literature. In normal circumstances, a person who abandons Jewish observance, or part of it, is classified as a meshumad. Such a person is still counted as a Jew for purposes of lineage, but is under a disability to claim any privilege pertaining to Jewish status: for example, he should not be counted in a minyan, that is, a quorum for religious services.

Anusim, by contrast, not only remain Jews by lineage but continue to count as fully qualified Jews for all purposes. Since the act of the original abandonment of the religion was done against the Jew's will, the Jew under force may remain a kosher Jew, as long as the anús keeps practising Jewish law to the best of his/her abilities under the coerced condition. In this sense, "kosher" is the rabbinic legal term applied to a Jew who adheres to rabbinic tradition and is accordingly not subject to any disqualification.

Rabbinic legal opinions
Se‘adyá ben Maimón ibn Danan in the 15th century stated:

Ben-Zion Meir Hai Uziel, the Chief Sephardic Rabbi of the State of Israel, stated in the mid-20th century:

It follows that Uziel considered anusím as Jews, because only Jews can give or receive a get, a Jewish divorce. Maimonides stated in the Mishneh Torah Sefer Shofetím, Hilekhót Mumarím 3:3:

Current status 
There is much controversy regarding the status of conversions today. While the chief rabbis are wary of converting large groups, there are some rabbis such as Haim Amsalem and Chuck Davidson who have done mass conversions of Bnei Anusim (descendants of original Anusim). In the United States Reform rabbi Jacques Cukierkorn is one of the leaders of the outreach movement to the descendants of those Crypto-Jews who wish to renew their ties with the Jewish people.

See also

References

Further reading
Gitlitz, David. 'Secrecy and Deceit: The Religion of the Crypto-Jews', Albuquerque, NM: University of New Mexico Press, 2002.
The Jews and the Crusaders: the Hebrew Chronicles of the First and Second Crusades (translator and editor: Shlomo Eidelberg). Madison: University of Wisconsin Press, 1977 
The Chronicle of Solomon bar Simson.--The Chronicle of Rabbi Eliezer bar Nathan.--The Narrative of the Old Persecutions, or Mainz anonymous.--Sefer Zekhirah, or The book of remembrance, of Rabbi Ephraim of Bonn.
Crisis and Leadership: Epistles of Maimonides; texts translated and notes by Abraham Halkin; discussions by David Hartman. Philadelphia: Jewish Publication Society of America, 1985  (reissued by the publisher as: Epistles of Maimonides: Crisis and Leadership in 1993).
Henry Kamen, The Spanish Inquisition: An Historical Revision. London: Weidenfeld & Nicolson, 1997 
José Faur, In the Shadow of History: Jews and Conversos at the Dawn of Modernity. Albany, N.Y.: State University of New York Press, 1992

External links
 Rabbinic legal discussions about Anusim
 600 years of Rabbinic Responsa regarding Anusim
 Conversos and Maskilim: Similar Issue, Different Approaches
 The Association of Crypto Jews of the Americas

 
 
Forced religious conversion